Chadi Georges Massaad is an architect and a Lebanese businessman, former president of the Central Fund for the Displaced.

Life

Born in 1959 in Bourj al Moulouk – Marjayoun in southern Lebanon, and belongs to the Greek Orthodox Church.

University-educated at the American University of Beirut, where he graduated as an architect (1984). He holds a master's degree in tourism management from Perpignan University in France and a doctorate in urban planning from the Lebanese University.

Political career
His name emerged in public affairs, after 15 years of civil war, thanks to the lead role he has played in restoring displaced from all Lebanese regions and rebuilding what has been destroyed by war and complete reconciliation between opposing groups, especially in mount Lebanon. He also worked to stop corruption in this process.

He maintained his independency in the Lebanese political field, and was prominent in rejecting Sectarianism and strongly criticizing the proposal for an election law known as Orthodox Meeting Law.

He has always defended the role of Christians in openness and communication with everyone, he believes that the Christian presence in the East remains and continue as long as Christians are keeping their leading role in opening up and communication with others.

Family life

He is married to Mona Kobrossi and has three children.

Business career
Chadi massaad  is currently chairman of CMG Engineering Group. He is the president of Lebanese Omani Business Council and was recently elected as the president of the Arab Creatures League.

 1984 – Member of the Order of Engineers and Architects
 1988 – Member of the Saudi Engineering Committee
 1993 – Member of the American Concrete Institute (ACI)
 1993 – Member of the Guggenheim Museum in New York
 2001 – Member of the board of trustees, Beirut Marathon
 2002 – Honorary president for Jouzour Heritage Association
 2002 – Member of the board of trustees of Lebanon youth movement
 2003 – Vice president of  the Antonine Club Baabda
 2004 – Vice president of the Lebanese-Chinese Friendship Association
 2008 – Member of the  Arabic Women Supporting Committee
 2008 – Chairman of the board of trustees of  'Kahef al Founoun' Association
 2013 – Member of the board of trustees of the Press Club
 2017 – Member of The Lebanese Spanish League
 2018 – Was a candidate for the parliamentary elections,  May 2018

He has received several medals and awards and has many publications.

References

1959 births
Living people
American University of Beirut alumni
Lebanese architects
Lebanese businesspeople
Lebanese politicians
Greek Orthodox Christians from Lebanon